Joondalup railway station is a railway station on the Transperth network. It is located on the Joondalup line, 26 kilometres from Perth station serving the regional metropolitan city of Joondalup.

History
Joondalup station opened on 20 December 1992 as the interim terminus of the Joondalup line. The line was extended to Currambine a year later in 1993.

In 2003, the contract for extending the platforms on seven Joondalup line stations, including Joondalup station, was awarded to Lakis Constructions. Along with the extensions, the platform edges were upgraded to bring them into line with tactile paving standards. Work on this station was done in mid-2004.

Services
Joondalup station is served by Transperth Joondalup line services.

Platforms

Bus routes 
Joondalup station is served by the following Transperth bus routes, including the Central Area Transit (CAT) services which operate a free shuttle around the suburb on weekdays and selected public holidays. These routes are primarily operated by two electric buses in a special red livery, which entered service in February 2022 as the first fully electric buses for Transperth. In mid-2022, two more electric buses entered service in a normal green livery, operating fare-paying routes around the area. These buses are charged nightly at the Joondalup Bus Depot.

Joondalup is also served by Transwa road coach services to Perth Coach Terminal and Geraldton.

References

External links

Joondalup
Joondalup line
Railway stations in Perth, Western Australia
Railway stations in Australia opened in 1992
Bus stations in Perth, Western Australia